The Upper Zambezi yellowfish, Labeobarbus codringtonii, is commonly found throughout the Zambezi and Okavango Rivers in Southern Africa. They prefer fast flowing water over cobble and rocky bottoms where they predominantly feed on aquatic insects and crustaceans. Their exaggerated fins help them manoeuvre in the fast water and they are powerful swimmers. The Zambezi yellowfish is highly sought after by sport anglers and fly fishing is the preferred method of catching them.

References

Labeobarbus
Taxa named by George Albert Boulenger
Fish described in 1908